Dhayendre Moodley is a South African scientist and Associate Professor at the University of KwaZulu-Natal.

Career
She received an Elizabeth Glaser Pediatric AIDS Foundation fellowship to work with John Sullivan at his laboratory. She is a member of the Academy of Science of South Africa. Over 100 journal papers have been co-authored by Moodley.

Research 
Dhayendre Moodley researches in the field of obstetrics with particular expertise in HIV in pregnant women.

References

External links

 

Living people
Academic staff of the University of KwaZulu-Natal
Year of birth missing (living people)
South African women scientists
Members of the Academy of Science of South Africa
21st-century women scientists